Lonneke is a feminine Dutch given name. Notable people with the name include:

Lonneke Engel (born 1981), Dutch fashion model and entrepreneur
Lonneke Slöetjes (born 1990), Dutch volleyball player
Lonneke Uneken (born 2000), Dutch professional racing cyclist

Dutch feminine given names